Morocco competed at the 2011 World Championships in Athletics from August 27 to September 4 in Daegu, South Korea.

Team selection

The Fédération Royale Marocaine d’Athlétisme
announced the final team of 19 athletes to represent the country
in the event. The men's team will be headed by 1500m specialist Amine Laâlou and the women's team by 800m specialist Halima Hachlaf.
  Hicham Sigueni was added for 5000m.  However, the final team on the entry list comprises again the names of only 19 athletes without Hicham Sigueni.

The following athlete appeared on the preliminary Entry List, but not on the Official Start List of the specific event:

Results

Men

Women

References

External links
Official local organising committee website
Official IAAF competition website

Nations at the 2011 World Championships in Athletics
World Championships in Athletics
Morocco at the World Championships in Athletics